Kayleigh Grace Clementine McKee (born January 14, 1994) is an American voice actress, known for her work on anime dubs for IYUNO-SDI, Crunchyroll, Bang Zoom! Entertainment,  NYAV Post, and Studiopolis. Some of her noteworthy roles include Matthias Hildesheimer in The Strongest Sage With the Weakest Crest and Yuta Okkotsu in Jujutsu Kaisen 0.

Biography
McKee was born in Macomb, Illinois, on January 14, 1994. She grew up in Galesburg, Illinois, and graduated from Abingdon High School in nearby Abingdon, Illinois. McKee's dad was a fan of anime and tabletop role-playing games like Dungeons & Dragons; he introduced McKee to the medium. She later got involved with theater. Being transgender, she was inspired by the actions of Laura Jane Grace, a transgender singer. This eventually motivated McKee to purse a career voice acting in anime.

Filmography

Anime series

Film

Video games

References

External links
 
 

1994 births
21st-century American actresses
Actresses from Illinois
American voice actresses
American video game actresses
Living people
People from Galesburg, Illinois
People from Macomb, Illinois
Transgender actresses
LGBT people from Illinois